The Itapecuru Formation is a geological formation in Itapecuru Mirim, Maranhão, Brazil.

It was formed during the Aptian to Albian stages of the Early Cretaceous. Dinosaur remains are among the fossils that have been recovered from the formation.

Vertebrate paleofauna 
 Theropod indet
 Theropod tracks
 Sauropod indet
 Amazonsaurus maranhensis
 Candidodon itapecuruense
 Itapecuruemys amazoniensis

See also 
 
 List of dinosaur-bearing rock formations

References 

Geologic formations of Brazil
Cretaceous Brazil
Lower Cretaceous Series of South America
Upper Cretaceous Series of South America
Albian Stage
Aptian Stage
Cenomanian Stage
Mudstone formations
Sandstone formations
Ichnofossiliferous formations
Fossiliferous stratigraphic units of South America
Paleontology in Brazil
Geography of Maranhão